The 1925 New Hampshire football team was an American football team that represented the University of New Hampshire as a member of the New England Conference during the 1925 college football season. In its 10th season under head coach William "Butch" Cowell, the team compiled a 4–1–2 record (2–0–1 against conference opponents), won the conference championship, and outscored opponents by a total of 91 to 59. The team played its home games in Durham, New Hampshire, at Memorial Field.

Schedule

 The Colby game was cancelled due to snow.

New Hampshire's 14 points against Brown broke a string of seven consecutive shutouts by the Bears; the Wildcats had last scored on Brown in their first-ever game, in 1905.

Notes

References

New Hampshire
New Hampshire Wildcats football seasons
New Hampshire football